Aussie Post may refer to:

 Australia Post, the government-owned postal service of Australia
 Australasian Post, the magazine